Root was a multimedia project composed of 25 one-minute guitar pieces improvised by Thurston Moore of Sonic Youth. These samples were sent out to around 100 people - both visual artists as well as musicians - in Hoover bags to remix or create accompanying artwork for. The results were then released on CD, as a limited edition CD in a numbered hoover bag (of which only 2000 were created), as a 5 piece vinyl box set, and as an exhibition which featured work by Angela Bulloch, David Bowie, Gavin Turk and many others.

Though no track listing comes with the album, just a list of the track contributors, some titles have come out in interviews with those involved. These are listed below where applicable.

Track listing
"Untitled" w/ Derek Bailey - (1:07)
"Keep Trying the Old Number" w/ Alec Empire - (4:58)
"Untitled" w/ Mogwai - (1:12)
"Moore Shit" w/ Luke Vibert - (4:50)
"Untitled" w/ Donald Christie & The Underdog - (1:38)
"101%" w/ Blur - (5:54)
"Untitled" w/ Mark Webber - (2:28)
"Untitled" w/ Stereolab - (3:42)
"Beaujolais Nouveau Day" w/ Cheap Glue - (2:11)
"Untitled" w/ Add N to (X) - (2:55)
"Untitled" w/ Spring Heel Jack - (5:16)
"Hard as Fuck '97" w/ The Hypnotist - (0:37)
"Your Love" w/ The Mellowtrons - (2:01)
"Roots" w/ Warren Defever - (4:01)
"Untitled" w/ V/Vm - (2:34)
"Untitled" w/ The Third Eye Foundation - (4:09)
"No. 11" w/ David Cunningham - (1:57)
"Needled" w/ Echo Park - (3:33)
"National Enhancer" w/ Merzbow - (3:44)
"Super" w/ Richard Thomas - (5:48)
"Untitled" w/ Stock, Hausen and Walkman - (4:10)
"Kleen" w/ Twisted Science vs Burzootie - (2:40)
"Scion" w/ Bruce Gilbert - (3:15)
"Untitled" w/ Arashi vs The Red King - (2:37)
"Chew on This" w/ Russell Haswell - (1:02)

References

1999 compilation albums